The Nor'Sea 37 is an American sailboat that was designed by Lyle Hess as a global blue water cruiser for living aboard and first built in 1992.

Production
The design was built by Nor'Sea Marine in Dana Point, California, United States, starting in 1992 but it is now out of production.

Design
The Nor'Sea 37 is a recreational keelboat, built predominantly of fiberglass, with wood trim. It has a cutter rig, a raked stem, a rounded transom, a keel and transom-hung rudder controlled by a tiller and a fixed modified long keel with a cutaway forefoot. It displaces  and carries  of lead ballast.

The design has sleeping accommodation for seven people, with a double berth in the bow cabin, a drop-down dinette table in the main cabin, a pilot berth amidships on the port side and an aft cabin with a double berth on the starboard side. The galley is located on the starboard side just forward of the companionway ladder. The galley is "U"-shaped and is equipped with a three-burner stove, an ice box and a sink. The head is located just aft of the galley on the starboard side.

See also
List of sailing boat types

Related development
Nor'Sea 27

Similar sailboats
Alberg 37
Baltic 37
C&C 37
C&C 110
CS 36
Dickerson 37
Dockrell 37
Endeavour 37
Express 37
Hunter 36-2
Marlow-Hunter 37
Tayana 37

References

Keelboats
1990s sailboat type designs
Sailing yachts
Sailboat type designs by Lyle Hess
Sailboat types built by Nor'Sea Marine